Applegate is an unincorporated community in Jackson County, Oregon, United States. It is west of Medford on Oregon Route 238 and the Applegate River. The community was probably named for Lindsay Applegate, who, along with his brothers Jesse and Charles, explored the Applegate Valley while blazing the Applegate Trail.

Wine production

In 2001, the Applegate Valley AVA became the sixth official wine appellation in Oregon.

Climate
This region experiences warm (but not hot) and dry summers, with no average monthly temperatures above .  According to the Köppen Climate Classification system, Applegate has a warm-summer Mediterranean climate, abbreviated "Csb" on climate maps.

References

External links
 Applegate School

Unincorporated communities in Jackson County, Oregon
Unincorporated communities in Oregon